3F-NEH (3-Fluoro-N-Ethylhexedrone) is a recreational designer drug from the substituted cathinone family, with stimulant effects. It was first identified in Sweden in October 2020.

See also
 3-Fluoromethamphetamine
 3-Fluoromethcathinone
 3F-NEB
 3F-PiHP
 3F-PVP
 3F-Phenmetrazine
 N-Ethylhexedrone
 N-Ethylhexylone

References 

Cathinones
Designer drugs
Serotonin-norepinephrine-dopamine releasing agents
Fluoroarenes